The electoral division of Braddon (named Darwin until 1955) is one of the five electorates in the Tasmanian House of Assembly, it includes north-west and western Tasmania as well as King Island. Braddon takes its name from the former Premier of Tasmania, Sir Edward Braddon. The division shares its name and boundaries with the federal division of Braddon.

Braddon and the other House of Assembly electoral divisions are each represented by five members elected under the Hare-Clark electoral system.

History and electoral profile
Prior to 1955, the electorate was known as Darwin. The electoral constituency includes; King Island, the North-west towns of Devonport, Burnie, Wynyard, Ulverstone, Penguin, and Smithton, as well as the West Coast towns of Strahan, Zeehan and Queenstown.

Representation

Distribution of seats

Members for Braddon and Darwin

See also

 Tasmanian Legislative Council

References

External links
Parliament of Tasmania
Tasmanian Electoral Commission - House of Assembly

Braddon
North West Tasmania
Western Tasmania